The 1912–13 season was Blackpool F.C.'s 16th season (13th consecutive) in the Football League. They competed in the twenty-team Division Two, then the second tier of English football, finishing bottom. Their application for re-election was successful.

George Wilson was the club's top scorer, with ten goals.

Season synopsis
Other than two victories in their opening four league games, Blackpool's nine wins were spaced out over the course of the season. By the league season's halfway point, a 4–0 Christmas Day defeat at Lancashire rivals Burnley, they had won only two further games. Of the remaining nineteen matches, Blackpool lost ten, a sequence that contributed to their finishing at the foot of the table.

In the FA Cup, Blackpool took Tottenham to a first-round replay after a 1–1 draw at White Hart Lane on 11 January. Three days later, the replay was played at the same venue after Blackpool sold Spurs the ground rights. The Londoners were victorious 6–1.

To the consternation of the Seasiders' fans, their arch-rivals Preston North End won the championship and Burnley took the second promotion spot.

Table

Player statistics

Appearances

League
Fiske – 22
Dale – 5
Gladwin – 10
Thorpe – 38
Connor – 28
Booth – 23
Charles – 38
Heslop – 27
Dollins – 13
Wilkinson – 15
Quinn – 32
Wilson – 24
Chapman – 2
Bainbridge – 28
Jones – 32
Kidd – 16
Gillow – 23
Crewdson – 17
Millership – 12
Davies – 3
McCulloch – 1
Keenan – 1
Reeves – 4
Pagnam – 3

Players used: 24

FA Cup
Thorpe – 2
Booth – 2
Charles – 2
Heslop – 2
Dollins – 2
Quinn – 1
Wilson – 2
Jones – 2
Kidd – 2
Gillow – 2
Crewdson – 2
Davies – 1

Players used: 12

Goals

League
Wilson – 10
Bainbridge – 9
Charles – 4
Heslop – 4
Connor – 3
Gillow – 3
Quinn – 3
Booth – 1
Dollins – 1
Wilkinson – 1

League goals scored: 39

FA Cup
Charles – 2

FA Cup goals scored: 2

Transfers

In

Out

Footnotes

 In Roy Calley's book, Gillow is incorrectly stated as having scored two league goals

References

Blackpool F.C.
Blackpool F.C. seasons